Athanasios (Thanasis) Bouras is a Greek politician. He holds a Ph.D. in physics and several physics publications. He was the deputy finance minister from 1990 to 1993 and currently represents Attica in the Hellenic Parliament. He is a member of New Democracy.

References

External links
 
 
 journalogy.net

1947 births
Living people
Finance ministers of Greece
20th-century Greek physicists
Academic staff of the National and Kapodistrian University of Athens
National and Kapodistrian University of Athens alumni
Greek MPs 2000–2004
Greek MPs 2004–2007
Greek MPs 2007–2009
Greek MPs 2009–2012
Greek MPs 2012 (May)
Greek MPs 2012–2014
Greek MPs 2015 (February–August)
Greek MPs 2015–2019
New Democracy (Greece) politicians
People from Karpenisi
Greek MPs 2019–2023